Takev may refer to:

 Takéo province, Cambodia, also spelled Takêv
 Takev Point, Antarctica
 Mihael Takev (1864–1920), Bulgarian politician, twice head of the Ministry of Interior (1908–1910, 1918)